Beris (also Romanized as Berīs; also known as Berīs-e Bālā) is a village in Sand-e Mir Suiyan Rural District, Dashtiari District, Dashtiari County, Sistan and Baluchestan Province, Iran. According to the 2006 census, its population was 2,356, forming 477 families. The beach at Beris is on the north of Sea of Oman, and is located in the province of Sistan. Near the beach are many boats and some special species of fish. There are views of Beris from the mountains nearby.

References 

Populated places in Chabahar County